The Fisher Horizon is a family of Canadian two-seats-in-tandem, conventional landing gear, single-engined, high-wing monoplane kit aircraft designed for construction by amateur builders. The Horizon 1 was inspired by the Aeronca Champion and its later version, the Bellanca Citabria, while the Horizon 2 was inspired by the Cessna O-1 Bird Dog.

Fisher Flying Products was originally based in Edgeley, North Dakota, USA but the company is now located in Woodbridge, Ontario, Canada.

Development
The Horizon 1 was designed by Fisher Aircraft in the United States in 1990, with the Horizon 2 following the next year. Both were intended to comply with the US Experimental - Amateur-built category, although both types qualify as ultralight aircraft in some countries, such as Canada. They also qualify as US Experimental Light Sport Aircraft.

The construction of the Horizon is of wood, with the wings, tail and fuselage covered with doped aircraft fabric. The aircraft features "V" struts, jury struts and a modified GA (W)-2 airfoil. The Horizon's main landing gear uses bungee suspension. The company claims an amateur builder can complete either aircraft from the kit in 600 hours.

Variants
Horizon 1
Two-seat tandem high-wing STOL aircraft with no rear window, flaps and swept tail. Fifty-five examples flying by 2011.
Horizon 2
Two-seat tandem high-wing STOL aircraft with a rear window, slotted flaps and ailerons and rounded tail. Forty examples flying by 2011.

Specifications

See also

References

External links

Horizon 1 official website
Horizon 2 official website
Photo of Horizon 1
Photo of Horizon 2

1990s Canadian ultralight aircraft
Light-sport aircraft
Aircraft first flown in 1990